Kirsten Penny is a professional English female ten-pin bowler. She has won numerous international events and regularly plays for Team England.

Career highlights
Wins
 2000 - Scott Banks Memorial Event
 2001 - 2001 World Games mixed doubles gold medal
 2001 - 10th Vodafone Malta Open
 2002 - Scott Banks Memorial Event (2)
 2003 - 15th Irish Open
 2003 - 1st Indonesian Open
 2003 - 29th Thailand Open Masters
 2004 - Scott Banks Memorial Event (3)
 2004 - 16th Irish Open

References

External links
Super Series Profile

British ten-pin bowling players
Year of birth missing (living people)
Living people
Competitors at the 2001 World Games
World Games gold medalists
World Games medalists in bowling